Ellan Vannin (the Manx-language name of the Isle of Man) is a poem and song, often referred to as "the alternative Manx national anthem", the words of which were written by Eliza Craven Green in 1854 and later set to music by someone called either J. Townsend or F. H. Townend (sources vary).

The Manx-language name Ellan Vannin is commonly mispronounced in renditions of the song, including in the Bee Gees version, since written Manx uses an orthography based on Welsh rather than Irish/Scots gaelic, which does not accurately transcribe the "ʲə" sound found in the word for "island" in spoken Manx Gaelic.

Poem

English-language version

When the summer day is over
And its busy cares have flown,
I sit beneath the starlight
With a weary heart, alone,
Then rises like a vision,
Sparkling bright in nature's glee,
My own dear 
With its green hills by the sea.

Then I hear the wavelets murmur
As they kiss the fairy shore,
Then beneath the em'rald waters
Sings the mermaid as of yore,
And the fair Isle shines with beauty
As in youth it dawned on me,
My own dear 
With its green hills by the sea.

Then mem'ries sweet and tender
Come like music's plaintive flow,
Of the hearts in 
That lov'd me long ago,
And I give with tears and blessings,
My own fondest thoughts to thee,
My own dear 
With its green hills by the sea.

Manx Gaelic (Gaelg) version 

Source:<ref>Manx Museum Library, Douglas, IOM: Manuscript 29117, Ellan Vannin, Manx language translation of poem/song originally written by Eliza Craven Green", Manx Language Scrapbook, Vol. II, Page 121, c. 1900, Translated by John Nelson, Ramsey</ref>

Tra ta'n laa  souree ec jerrey
As imneaghyn lhie ersooyl
mish my hoie fo ny rollageyn,
slane my lomarcan as skee
Eisht ta girree gollrish ashlish,
Loandyr gial as dooghyssagh
she oo hene o Ellan Vannin,
Lesh  croink glassey rish y cheayn.

Ta mee clashtyn tharmane tonnyn
Myr t'ad nish paagey yn traie ;
As heese dowin fo'n ushtey geayney
Kiaulleeagh foast ta'n ven-varrey ;
As ta'n Ellan soilshean aalin
Myr ve ayns my aegid hene ;
My heer deyr, shenn Ellan Vannin
Lesh croink glassey rish y cheayn.

Nish ta smooinaght millish meiyghagh
Cheet myr kiaulleeaght gys my chree ;
Jeh ny cree'ghyn va ayns Mannin
Foddey roie hug graih da mee ;
Ta mee coyrt lesh jeir as bannaght
Nish my smooinaght share dhyt hene ;
My heer deyr, shenn Ellan Vannin,
Lesh croink glassey rish y cheayn.

The Bee Gees version
The Bee Gees recorded a version for Isle of Man charities. They also included the song in their world-tour as a show of pride in the place of their birth. It was recorded in 1997, and released and re-released as a single, 1998–1999.When the summer day is over,Its busy cares have flown,I will sit beneath the starlight,With a weary heart alone.Then it rises like a visionSparkling bright it shines for meMy own dear With its green hills by the seaLet me hear the ocean murmurLet me watch your stormy skyThen above the emerald watersSings the seagull as she fliesThen arising like a visionSparkling bright it shines for meMy own dear With its green hills by the seaAnd in all my times of sorrowAnd on some lonely shoreI'll go back to To my childhood days once more''

See also
 Isle of Man
 Music of the Isle of Man

References

External links
 Manx Notebook - Music and Lyrics for Ellan Vannin by Eliza Craven Green.

1854 poems
Manx literature
Manx music
Manx culture